A service club or service organization is a voluntary nonprofit organization where members meet regularly to perform charitable works either by direct hands-on efforts or by raising money for other organizations. A service club is defined firstly by its service mission and secondly its membership benefits, such as social occasions, networking, and personal growth opportunities that encourage involvement.

A service organization is not necessarily exclusive of ideological motives, although organizations with such defined motives are more likely to identify themselves through their association. Much like the historical religious organizations that formed the basis for many societal institutions, such as hospitals, service organizations perform many essential services for their community and other worthy causes. In the United States, some of these clubs usually also have a component club organization that is a tax exempt 501(c)(3) nonprofit organization.

Many of today's service clubs got their start as social clubs for business networking, but quickly evolved into organizations devoted more to service than to networking, although networking may still be the primary reason many members decided to join.

Historically, most service clubs consist of community-based groups that share the same name, goals, membership requirements, and meeting structure.  Many of these clubs meet weekly, bi-weekly, or monthly on a recurring established day and time, commonly at a mealtime.  Most of these clubs started with a single club in a single city, but then replicated themselves by organizing similar clubs in other communities.  Many of the service club organizations have become worldwide movements, and have obtained official recognition by the United Nations and various governments as non-governmental organizations (NGO).

The May Court Club was founded in Ottawa Canada  in 1898 by Lady Aberdeen, the wife of the Governor General. She was a visionary and an advocate for social justice for all, and she believed that women needed to volunteer their time and skills in the community. In addition to May Court she founded the Victorian Order of Nurses and the Council of Women during her time in Canada. 

The Rotary Club of Chicago, was formed in 1905 by Paul Harris, an attorney who wanted to create a professional club with the same friendly spirit he had felt in the small towns of his youth. The Rotary name derived from the early practice of rotating meetings among members' offices.

References 

Community building